Italian submarine Dessiè was an  built for the Royal Italian Navy (Regia Marina) during the 1930s. It was named after the town of Dessie in north-central Ethiopia.

Design and description
The Adua-class submarines were essentially repeats of the preceding . They displaced  surfaced and  submerged.

For surface running, the boats were powered by two  diesel engines, each driving one propeller shaft. When submerged each propeller was driven by a  electric motor. They could reach  on the surface and  underwater.

The boats were armed with six internal  torpedo tubes, four in the bow and two in the stern. One reload torpedo was carried for each tube, for a total of twelve. They were also armed with one  deck gun for combat on the surface. The light anti-aircraft armament consisted of one or two pairs of   machine guns.

Construction and career

Dessiè was built at the Tosi shipyard in Taranto. She was laid down on 20 April 1936, launched on 22 November of the same year, and commissioned on 14 April 1937. Upon commission, she was assigned to 43rd Submarine Squadron in Taranto. During August and September of 1937 she performed several missions during the Spanish Civil War but without any success. In 1938 she was reassigned to Tobruk, and in 1940 she returned to Italy, and was assigned to 46th Squadron (IV Submarine Group) based first at Taranto and then at Augusta.

At the beginning of the World War II, from 8 to 16 August 1940, Dessiè, under command of Captain Fausto Sestini, patrolled the waters between Gaudo and Cerigotto, just off the coast of Crete. In the evening of August 13 she sighted a fast transport moving east. An attack was attempted but was unsuccessful because of the speed of the target.

Between late October and early November, Dessiè was part of a group of four submarines sent to patrol an area between the Ionian Sea and the Aegean Sea, but no sightings were made, even though the British fleet was in that area at the time.

At the end of the month, she was again deployed, now under command of Captain Adriano Pini, this time off Malta, with the task of intercepting the ships of British Operation Collar. At 3:05 on 28 November, she sighted a naval column consisting of three capital ships. Dessiè launched two stern torpedoes from 3,500 meters against a middle target, and disengaged by diving. An explosion was heard, but British official documents mention no attack by Dessié or any damage inflicted.

Between 16–25 December 1940, Dessiè together with submarines  and  patrolled around Malta. In January 1941, she was deployed off Derna. Both patrols were uneventful.

On 20 May 1941, Dessiè together with numerous other submarines was deployed to an area between Crete, Alexandria and Sollum to support the German invasion of Crete (Operation Merkur).

On 21 and 22 July 1941, Dessiè along with three other submarines was deployed to area between Pantelleria and Malta. Her task was to intercept a British convoy, part of Operation Substance, but she did not sight any enemy ships.

On 3 January 1942, Dessiè was sent to patrol an area south off Malta with the task of detecting and attacking any British naval forces that might attempt to intercept Italian convoy "M 43", bringing supplies to Libya. No ships were detected.

However, the submarine did not sight any enemy ships.

On 11 August 1942, Dessiè, now under command of Captain Renato Scandola, was among eleven submarines deployed off the coast Tunisia between Scoglio Due Fratelli and Skerki Banks. Her task was to intercept a British convoy for Malta, part of Operation Pedestal. Around 19:00 on 12 August, Dessiè sighted the convoy, counting 14 merchants and ten destroyers. At 19:10, she closed in to within  and at 19:38 she launched four torpedoes. After one minute and forty seconds, a loud explosion was heard, as SS Brisbane Star (12,791 GRT) was hit. However, the steamship succeeded in restarting her engines and reaching Malta on 14 August after a short stop in Soussa, even though she was further damaged by German torpedo bombers. At 19:56, Dessiè, while preparing to launch her stern torpedoes, was attacked by enemy destroyers, who continued their attacks until 21:27 without causing any damage to the submarine. Dessiè surfaced at 22:12 and continued her patrol. In the evening of 13 August, she was bombed by an aircraft, that killed one crew member and wounded several others and caused damage to her batteries, which forced her to return to base.

On 2 November 1942, Dessiè left Messina at 21:15 carrying 20 tons of ammunition to Tobruk. She arrived in Tobruk around 5 or 6 November, unloaded her cargo and departed at 16:10 to return to Messina, arriving on 11 November.

On 18 November, Dessiè sailed from Messina, under command of Captain Alberto Gorini, to patrol an area off the coast of Bona, Algeria, and to attack enemy traffic around the ports of Philippeville and Bougie. At 19:12 on 27 November, Captain Gorini communicated with his base for the last time. Detected and hit hard by depth charges, Dessiè had to surface with a noticeable stern list; she went down and finally sank stern first with all hands.

Notes

References
 

Adua-class submarines
World War II submarines of Italy
Lost submarines of Italy
Maritime incidents in November 1942
World War II shipwrecks in the Mediterranean Sea
1936 ships
Ships built by Cantieri navali Tosi di Taranto
Ships built in Taranto
Ships lost with all hands
Submarines sunk by British warships
Submarines sunk by Australian warships